Wrestling was contested by men and women at the 2006 Asian Games in Doha, Qatar. Only men competed in Greco-Roman wrestling while both men and women contested for medals in freestyle wrestling. All competition were held from December 9 to December 14 at Aspire Hall 4.

Schedule

Medalists

Men's freestyle

Men's Greco-Roman

Women's freestyle

Medal table

Participating nations
A total of 236 athletes from 28 nations competed in wrestling at the 2006 Asian Games:

References
FILA Database

External links

 
2006
Asian Games
2006 Asian Games events